Khaled Al-Khathlan (born 1 January 1995) is a Saudi Arabian professional footballer who plays as a left-back for Pro League side Al-Raed.

Career
Al-Khathlan began his career at the youth team of Al-Hilal. He joined the U23 team of Al-Nassr in 2015. On 14 August 2017, Al-Khathlan signed for Al-Qaisumah. On 9 July 2019, Al-Khathlan signed a three-year contract with Abha. On 31 January 2020, Al-Khathlan joined Al-Raed and signed a 3-year contract with the club.

Career statistics

Club

References

External links 
 

1995 births
Living people
Saudi Arabian footballers
Al Hilal SFC players
Al Nassr FC players
Al-Qaisumah FC players
Abha Club players
Al-Raed FC players
Saudi Professional League players
Saudi First Division League players
Association football defenders